Alcoholics Anonymous (AA) is an international peer-led mutual aid fellowship meeting online and in-person dedicated to abstinence-based recovery from alcoholism through its spiritually-inclined Twelve Step program. Following its Twelve Traditions AA is non-professional and non-denominational, as well as apolitical and unaffiliated. In 2020 AA estimated its worldwide membership to be over two million with 75% of those in the U.S. and Canada.

Regarding its effectiveness, a 2020 scientific review saw clinical interventions encouraging increased AA participation resulting in higher abstinence rates over other clinical interventions, and most studies in the review found that AA led to lower health costs.  While AA has no opinion on the disease model of alcoholism—or on any medical matter, the large role of many members in popularizing it has led to its association with AA. 

AA dates its start to 1935 with Bill Wilson (Bill W) first commiserating alcoholic to alcoholic with Bob Smith (Dr. Bob) who, along with Wilson, was active in AA's immediate precursor the Christian revivalist Oxford Group. Within the Oxford Group Wilson and Smith, joined by other alcoholics, supported each other in meetings and one on one until breaking off to form a fellowship of alcoholics only. In 1939 they published Alcoholics Anonymous: The Story of How More Than One Hundred Men Have Recovered From Alcoholism. Known as the "Big Book" and as the source of AA’s name, it contains AA's Twelve Step recovery program. Subsequent editions included the Twelve Traditions adopted in 1950 to formalize and unify the fellowship which Wilson called “a benign anarchy”. 

The Twelve Steps are presented as a suggested self-improvement program resulting in a spiritual awakening after an alcoholic has conceded powerlessness over alcohol and acknowledged its damage, as well as having listed and strived to correct personal failings and by making amends for misdeeds. After completing the Steps they suggest members take other alcoholics through them. Though not explicitly prescribed, this is often done by sponsoring other alcoholics. Discovering and following the will of God—"as we understood Him"— is also urged by the Steps, but differing spiritual practices and persuasions, as well as non-theist members, are accepted and accommodated.

The Twelve Traditions are AA's advisory guidelines for members, groups and the rest of its organization. Besides making a desire to stop drinking the only membership requirement, the Traditions advise against dogma, hierarchies and involvement in public controversies so recovery from alcoholism remains AA’s primary purpose. Without threat of retribution or means of enforcement the Traditions urge members to remain anonymous in public media. They also wish that members or groups to not use AA to gain wealth, property or prestige. The Traditions establish AA groups as autonomous, self-supporting through members’ voluntary contributions while rejecting outside contributions, and, as with all of AA, should not represent AA as affiliated with or in support of other organizations or causes.

With AA's permission fellowships such as Narcotics Anonymous and Gamblers Anonymous have adopted and adapted the Twelve Steps and the Twelve Traditions to their addiction recovery programs.

History

AA was founded on 10 June 1935. But AA's origins are said to have begun when the renowned psychotherapist Carl Jung inspired Ronald H., an otherwise hopeless drunk, to seek a spiritual solution by sending him to the Oxford Group—a non-denominational, altruistic Christian movement modeled after first-century Christianity. Ebby Thacher, a drinking buddy of Wilson's, got sober in that same Oxford Group and reached out to help his friend. Thacher approached Wilson saying that he had "got religion", was sober, and that Wilson could do the same if he set aside objections and instead formed a personal idea of God, "another power" or "higher power". Feeling a "kinship of common suffering", Wilson attended his first group gathering, although he was drunk.  Within days, Wilson admitted himself to the Charles B. Towns Hospital after drinking four beers on the way—the last alcohol he ever drank. Under the care of William Duncan Silkworth (an early benefactor of AA), Wilson's detox included the deliriant belladonna. At the hospital, a despairing Wilson experienced a bright flash of light, which he felt to be God revealing himself. 
 
Following his hospital discharge, Wilson joined the Oxford Group and tried to recruit other alcoholics to the group.  These early efforts to help others kept him sober, but were ineffective in getting  anyone else to join the group and get sober.  Dr. Silkworth suggested that Wilson place less stress on religion (as required per The Oxford Group) and more on the science of treating alcoholism. 
 
Wilson's first success came during a business trip to Akron, Ohio, where he was introduced to Robert Smith, a surgeon and Oxford Group member who was unable to stay sober. After thirty days of working with Wilson, Smith drank his last drink on 10 June 1935, the date marked by AA for its anniversaries.

The first female member, Florence Rankin, joined AA in March 1937, and the first non-Protestant member, a Roman Catholic, joined in 1939. The first Black AA group was established in 1945 in Washington, D.C. by Jim S., an African-American physician from Virginia.

Several years after 1935, in writing the Big Book, Bill W. developed the twelve steps, influenced by the Oxford Group's 6 steps, and readings including William James's The Varieties of Religious Experience.

The Big Book, the Twelve Steps, and the Twelve Traditions
To share their method, Wilson and other members wrote the initially-titled book, Alcoholics Anonymous: The Story of How More Than One Hundred Men Have Recovered from Alcoholism, from which AA drew its name. Informally known as "The Big Book" (with its first 164 pages virtually unchanged since the 1939 edition), it suggests a twelve-step program in which members admit that they are powerless over alcohol and need help from a "higher power". They seek guidance and strength through prayer and meditation from God or a Higher Power of their own understanding; take a moral inventory with care to include resentments; list and become ready to remove character defects; list and make amends to those harmed; continue to take a moral inventory, pray, meditate, and try to help other alcoholics recover. The second half of the book, "Personal Stories" (subject to additions, removal, and retitling in subsequent editions), is made of AA members' redemptive autobiographical sketches.

In 1941, interviews on American radio and favorable articles in US magazines, including a piece by Jack Alexander in The Saturday Evening Post, led to increased book sales and membership. By 1946, as the growing fellowship quarreled over structure, purpose, and authority, as well as finances and publicity, Wilson began to form and promote what became known as AA's "Twelve Traditions," which are guidelines for an altruistic, unaffiliated, non-coercive, and non-hierarchical structure that limited AA's purpose to only helping alcoholics on a non-professional level while shunning publicity. Eventually, he gained formal adoption and inclusion of the Twelve Traditions in all future editions of the Big Book. At the 1955 conference in St. Louis, Missouri, Wilson relinquished stewardship of AA to the General Service Conference, as AA grew to millions of members internationally.

Organization and finances

AA says it is "not organized in the formal or political sense", and Bill Wilson, borrowing the phrase from anarchist theorist Peter Kropotkin, called it a "benign anarchy". In Ireland, Shane Butler said that AA "looks like it couldn't survive as there's no leadership or top-level telling local cumanns what to do, but it has worked and proved itself extremely robust". Butler explained that "AA's 'inverted pyramid' style of governance has helped it to avoid many of the pitfalls that political and religious institutions have encountered since it was established here in 1946."

In 2018, AA counted 2,087,840 members and 120,300 AA groups worldwide. The Twelve Traditions informally guide how individual AA groups function, and the Twelve Concepts for World Service guide how the organization is structured globally.

A member who accepts a service position or an organizing role is a "trusted servant" with terms rotating and limited, typically lasting three months to two years and determined by group vote and the nature of the position. Each group is a self-governing entity with AA World Services acting only in an advisory capacity. AA is served entirely by alcoholics, except for seven "nonalcoholic friends of the fellowship" of the 21-member AA Board of Trustees.

AA groups are self-supporting, relying on voluntary donations from members to cover expenses. The AA General Service Office (GSO) limits contributions to US$3,000 a year. Above the group level, AA may hire outside professionals for services that require specialized expertise or full-time responsibilities.

Like individual groups, the GSO is self-supporting. AA receives proceeds from books and literature that constitute more than 50% of the income for its General Service Office. In keeping with AA's Seventh Tradition, the Central Office is fully self-supporting through the sale of literature and related products, and the voluntary donations of AA members and groups. It does not accept donations from people or organizations outside of AA.

In keeping with AA's Eighth Tradition, the Central Office employs special workers who are compensated financially for their services, but their services do not include traditional "12th Step" work of working with alcoholics in need. All 12th Step calls that come to the Central Office are handed to sober AA members who have volunteered to handle these calls. It also maintains service centers, which coordinate activities such as printing literature, responding to public inquiries, and organizing conferences. Other International General Service Offices (Australia, Costa Rica, Russia, etc.) are independent of AA World Services in New York.

Program

AA's program extends beyond abstaining from alcohol. Its goal is to effect enough change in the alcoholic's thinking "to bring about recovery from alcoholism" through "an entire psychic change," or spiritual awakening. A spiritual awakening is meant to be achieved by taking the Twelve Steps, and sobriety is furthered by volunteering for AA and regular AA meeting attendance or contact with AA members. Members are encouraged to find an experienced fellow alcoholic, called a sponsor, to help them understand and follow the AA program. The sponsor should preferably have experience of all twelve of the steps, be the same sex as the sponsored person, and refrain from imposing personal views on the sponsored person. Following the helper therapy principle, sponsors in AA may benefit from their relationship with their charges, as "helping behaviors" correlate with increased abstinence and lower probabilities of binge drinking.

AA's program is an inheritor of Counter-Enlightenment philosophy. AA shares the view that acceptance of one's inherent limitations is critical to finding one's proper place among other humans and God. Such ideas are described as "Counter-Enlightenment" because they are contrary to the Enlightenment's ideal that humans have the capacity to make their lives and societies a heaven on Earth using their own power and reason.
After evaluating AA's literature and observing AA meetings for sixteen months, sociologists David R. Rudy and Arthur L. Greil found that for an AA member to remain sober a high level of commitment is necessary. This commitment is facilitated by a change in the member's worldview. To help members stay sober AA must, they argue, provide an all-encompassing worldview while creating and sustaining an atmosphere of transcendence in the organization. To be all-encompassing AA's ideology emphasizes tolerance rather than a narrow religious worldview that could make the organization unpalatable to potential members and thereby limit its effectiveness. AA's emphasis on the spiritual nature of its program, however, is necessary to institutionalize a feeling of transcendence. A tension results from the risk that the necessity of transcendence if taken too literally, would compromise AA's efforts to maintain a broad appeal. As this tension is an integral part of AA, Rudy and Greil argue that AA is best described as a quasi-religious organization.

Meetings

AA meetings are gatherings where recovery from alcoholism is discussed. One perspective sees them as "quasi-ritualized therapeutic sessions run by and for, alcoholics". There are a variety of meeting types some of which are listed below. At some point during the meeting a basket is passed around for voluntary donations. AA's 7th tradition requires that  groups be self-supporting, "declining outside contributions". Weekly meetings are listed in local AA directories in print, online and in  apps.

Open vs Closed Meetings
"Open" meetings welcome anyone—nonalcoholics can attend as observers. Meetings listed as "closed" welcome those with a self-professed "desire to stop drinking," which cannot be challenged by another member on any grounds.

Speaker Meetings
At speaker meetings one or more members come to tell their stories.

Big Book Meetings
At Big Book meetings, attendees read from the AA Big Book and discuss it.

Discussion Meetings
There are also meetings with or without a topic that allow participants to speak up or "share".

Online vs. Offline Meetings
Online meetings are digital meetings held on platforms such as Zoom.  Offline meetings, also called "face to face," "brick and mortar," or "in-person" meetings, are held in a shared physical real-world location.  Some meetings are hybrid meetings, where people can meet in a specified physical location, but people can also join the meeting virtually.

Specialized Meetings

AA meetings do not exclude other alcoholics, though some meetings cater to specific demographics such as gender, profession, age, sexual orientation, or culture. Meetings in the United States are held in a variety of languages including Armenian, English, Farsi, Finnish, French, Japanese, Korean, Russian, and Spanish.

Meeting formats

While AA has pamphlets that suggest meeting formats, groups have the autonomy to hold and conduct meetings as they wish "except in matters affecting other groups or AA as a whole". Different cultures affect ritual aspects of meetings, but around the world "many particularities of the AA meeting format can be observed at almost any AA gathering".

Confidentiality
In the Fifth Step, AA members typically reveal their own past misconduct to their sponsors. US courts have not extended the status of privileged communication, such as physician-patient privilege or clergy–penitent privilege, to communications between an AA member and their sponsor.

Spirituality
Some medical professionals have criticized 12-step programs as "a cult that relies on God as the mechanism of action" and as "overly theistic and outdated". Others have cited the necessity of a "higher power" in formal AA as creating dependence on outside factors rather than internal efficacy. A 2010 study found  increased attendance at AA meetings was associated with increased spirituality and decreased frequency and intensity of alcohol use. Since the mid-1970s, several 'agnostic' or 'no-prayer' AA groups have begun across the US, Canada, and other parts of the world, which hold meetings that adhere to a tradition allowing alcoholics to freely express their doubts or disbelief that spirituality will help their recovery, and these meetings forgo the use of opening or closing prayers.

Disease concept of alcoholism

More informally than not, AA's membership has helped popularize the disease concept of alcoholism which had appeared in the eighteenth century. Though AA usually avoids the term disease, 1973 conference-approved literature said "we had the disease of alcoholism." Regardless of official positions, since AA's inception, most members have believed alcoholism to be a disease.

AA's Big Book calls alcoholism "an illness which only a spiritual experience will conquer." Ernest Kurtz says this is "The closest the book Alcoholics Anonymous comes to a definition of alcoholism." Somewhat divergently in his introduction to The Big Book, non-member and early benefactor William Silkworth said those unable to moderate their drinking suffer from an allergy. In presenting the doctor's postulate, AA said "The doctor's theory that we have an allergy to alcohol interests us. As laymen, our opinion as to its soundness may, of course, mean little. But as ex-problem drinkers, we can say that his explanation makes good sense. It explains many things for which we cannot otherwise account." AA later acknowledged that "alcoholism is not a true allergy, the experts now inform us." Wilson explained in 1960 why AA had refrained from using the term disease:

Since then medical and scientific communities have defined alcoholism as an "addictive disease" (aka Alcohol Use Disorder, Severe, Moderate, or Mild). The ten criteria are: alcoholism is a Primary Illness not caused by other illnesses nor by personality or character defects; second, an addiction gene is part of its etiology; third, alcoholism has predictable symptoms; fourth, it is progressive, becoming more severe even after long periods of abstinence; fifth, it is chronic and incurable; sixth, alcoholic drinking or other drug use persists in spite of negative consequences and efforts to quit; seventh, brain chemistry and neural functions change so alcohol is perceived as necessary for survival; eighth, it produces physical dependence and life-threatening withdrawal; ninth, it is a terminal illness; tenth, alcoholism can be treated and can be kept in remission.

Canadian and United States demographics
AA's New York General Service Office regularly surveys AA members in North America. Its 2014 survey of over 6,000 members in Canada and the United States concluded that, in North America, AA members who responded to the survey were 62% male and 38% female. The survey found that 89% of AA members were white.

Average member sobriety is slightly under 10 years with 36% sober more than ten years, 13% sober from five to ten years, 24% sober from one to five years, and 27% sober less than one year. Before coming to AA, 63% of members received some type of treatment or counseling, such as medical, psychological, or spiritual. After coming to AA, 59% received outside treatment or counseling. Of those members, 84% said that outside help played an important part in their recovery.

The same survey showed that AA received 32% of its membership from other members, another 32% from treatment facilities, 30% were self-motivated to attend AA, 12% of its membership from court-ordered attendance, and only 1% of AA members decided to join based on information obtained from the Internet.  People taking the survey were allowed to select multiple answers for what motivated them to join AA.

Relationship with institutions

Hospitals
Many AA meetings take place in treatment facilities. Carrying the message of AA into hospitals was how the co-founders of AA first remained sober. They discovered great value in working with alcoholics who are still suffering, and that even if the alcoholic they were working with did not stay sober, they did. Bill Wilson wrote, "Practical experience shows that nothing will so much insure immunity from drinking as intensive work with other alcoholics". Bill Wilson visited Towns Hospital in New York City in an attempt to help the alcoholics who were patients there in 1934. At St. Thomas Hospital in Akron, Ohio, Smith worked with still more alcoholics. In 1939, a New York mental institution, Rockland State Hospital, was one of the first institutions to allow AA hospital groups. Service to corrections and treatment facilities used to be combined until the General Service Conference, in 1977, voted to dissolve its Institutions Committee and form two separate committees, one for treatment facilities, and one for correctional facilities.

Prisons
In the United States and Canada, AA meetings are held in hundreds of correctional facilities. The AA General Service Office has published a workbook with detailed recommendations for methods of approaching correctional-facility officials with the intent of developing an in-prison AA program. In addition, AA publishes a variety of pamphlets specifically for the incarcerated alcoholic. Additionally, the AA General Service Office provides a pamphlet with guidelines for members working with incarcerated alcoholics.

United States court rulings

United States courts have ruled that inmates, parolees, and probationers cannot be ordered to attend AA. Though AA itself was not deemed a religion, it was ruled that it contained enough religious components (variously described in Griffin v. Coughlin below as, inter alia, "religion", "religious activity", "religious exercise") to make coerced attendance at AA meetings a violation of the Establishment Clause of the First Amendment of the constitution. In 2007, the Ninth Circuit of the U.S. Court of Appeals stated that a parolee who was ordered to attend AA had standing to sue his parole office.

United States treatment industry
In 1939, High Watch Recovery Center in Kent, Connecticut, was founded by Bill Wilson and Marty Mann.  Sister Francis who owned the farm tried to gift the spiritual retreat for alcoholics to Alcoholics Anonymous, however citing the sixth tradition Bill W. turned down the gift but agreed to have a separate non-profit board run the facility composed of AA members.  Bill Wilson and Marty Mann served on the High Watch board of directors for many years.  High Watch was the first and therefore the oldest 12-step-based treatment center in the world still operating today.

In 1949, the Hazelden treatment center was founded and staffed by AA members, and since then many alcoholic rehabilitation clinics have incorporated AA's precepts into their treatment programs. 32% of AA's membership was introduced to it through a treatment facility.

Effectiveness
There are several ways one can determine whether AA works and numerous ways of measuring if AA is successful, such as looking at abstinence, reduced drinking intensity, reduced alcohol-related consequences, alcohol addiction severity, and healthcare cost.

The effectiveness of AA (compared to other methods and treatments) has been challenged throughout the years, but recent high quality clinical meta-studies using quasi-experiment studies show that AA costs less than other treatments and results in increased abstinence. In longitudinal studies, AA appears to be about as effective as other abstinence-based support groups.

Because of the anonymous and voluntary nature of AA meetings, it has been difficult to perform random trials with them. Environmental and quasi-experiment studies suggest that AA can help alcoholics make positive changes. 

In the past, some medical professionals have criticized 12-step programs as pseudoscientific and "a cult that relies on God as the mechanism of action". Until recently, ethical and operational issues had prevented robust randomized controlled trials from being conducted comparing 12-step programs directly to other approaches. Others, including addiction researcher Nicole Lee, have expressed concerns about the nature of many published AA studies, given that many are conducted by the "fellowship" itself. More recent studies employing randomized and blinded trials have shown 12-step programs provide similar benefit compared to motivational enhancement therapy (MET) and cognitive behavioral therapy (CBT), and were more effective in producing continuous abstinence and remission compared to these approaches.

Cochrane 2020 review 

A 2020 Cochrane review concluded that "compared to other well-established treatments, clinical linkage using well-articulated Twelve-Step Facilitation (TSF) manualized interventions intended to increase Alcoholics Anonymous (AA) participation" are more effective than other established treatments, such as motivational enhancement therapy (MET) and cognitive-behavioral therapy (CBT), as measured by abstinence rates. Manualized TSF probably achieves additional desirable outcomes—such as fewer drinks per drinking day and less severe alcohol-related problems—at equivalent rates as other treatments, although evidence for such a conclusion comes from low to moderate certainty evidence "so should be regarded with caution".

In response to a concern expressed by another addiction researcher that "those more strongly committed to total abstinence after receiving AA/TSF were likely to experience more protracted 'slips' if they did for any reason drink", the Cochrane review authors stated that subjects who did not achieve abstinence did not have worse drinking outcomes overall.

Older studies 
A 2006 study by Rudolf H. Moos and Bernice S. Moos saw a 67% success rate 16 years later for the 24.9% of alcoholics who ended up, on their own, undergoing a lot of AA treatment.  The study's results may be skewed by self-selection bias.

Project MATCH was a 1990s 8-year, multi-site, $27-million investigation that studied which types of alcoholics respond best to which forms of treatment.

Brandsma 1980 showed that Alcoholics Anonymous is more effective than no treatment whatsoever.

Membership retention 

In 2001–2002, the National Institute on Alcohol Abuse and Alcoholism (NIAAA) conducted the National Epidemiological Survey on Alcoholism and Related Conditions (NESARC). Similarly structured to the NLAES, the survey conducted in-person interviews with 43,093 individuals. Respondents were asked if they had ever attended a twelve-step meeting for an alcohol problem in their lifetime (the question was not AA-specific). 1441 (3.4%) of respondents answered the question affirmatively. Answers were further broken down into three categories: disengaged, those who started attending at some point in the past but had ceased attending at some point in the past year (988); continued engagement, those who started attending at some point in the past and continued to attend during the past year (348); and newcomers, those who started attending during the past year (105). In their discussion of the findings, Kaskautas et al. (2008) state that to study disengagement, only the disengaged and continued engagement should be utilized (pg. 270).

The popular press

The Sober Truth 
American psychiatrist Lance Dodes, in The Sober Truth, says that research indicates that only five to eight percent of the people who go to one or more AA meetings achieve sobriety.

The 5–8% figure put forward by Dodes is controversial; other doctors say that the book uses "three separate, questionable, calculations that arrive at the 5–8% figure."  Addiction specialists state that the book's conclusion that "[12-step] approaches are almost completely ineffective and even harmful in treating substance use disorders" is wrong. One review called Dodes' reasoning against AA success a "pseudostatistical polemic."

Dodes has not, as of March 2020, read the 2020 Cochrane review showing AA efficacy, but opposes the idea that a social network is needed to overcome substance abuse.

The Irrationality of Alcoholics Anonymous 
In a 2015 article for The Atlantic, Gabrielle Glaser criticized the dominance of AA in the treatment of addiction in the United States.  Her article uses Lance Dodes's figures and a 2006 Cochrane report to state AA had a low success rate, but those figures were subsequently criticized by experts as outdated.  The Glaser article incorrectly conflates the efficacy of treatment centers with the efficacy of Alcoholics Anonymous. The Glaser article says that "nothing about the 12-step approach draws on modern science", but a large amount of scientific research has been done with AA, showing that AA increases abstinence rates. The Glaser article criticizes 12-step programs for being "faith-based", but 12-step programs allow for a very wide diversity of spiritual beliefs, and there are a growing number of secular 12-step meetings.

Criticism

Sexual advances ("thirteenth-stepping")

"Thirteenth-stepping" is a pejorative term for AA members approaching new members for dates.  A study in the Journal of Addiction Nursing sampled 55 women in AA and found that 35% of these women had experienced a "pass" and 29% had felt seduced at least once in AA settings. This has also happened with new male members who received guidance from older female AA members pursuing sexual company. The authors suggest that both men and women must be prepared for this behavior or find male or female-only groups. Women-only meetings are a very prevalent part of AA culture, and AA has become more welcoming for women. AA's pamphlet on sponsorship suggests that men be sponsored by men and women be sponsored by women.

Alcoholics Anonymous World Services has a safety flier which states that "Unwanted sexual advances and predatory behaviors are in conflict with carrying the A.A. message of recovery."

Criticism of culture

Stanton Peele argued that some AA groups apply the disease model to all problem drinkers, whether or not they are "full-blown" alcoholics. Along with Nancy Shute, Peele has advocated that besides AA, other options should be readily available to those problem drinkers who can manage their drinking with the right treatment. The Big Book says "moderate drinkers" and "a certain type of hard drinker" can stop or moderate their drinking. The Big Book suggests no program for these drinkers, but instead seeks to help drinkers without "power of choice in drink."

In 1983, a review stated that the AA program's focus on admission of having a problem increases deviant stigma and strips members of their previous cultural identity, replacing it with the deviant identity. A 1985 study based on observations of AA meetings warned of detrimental iatrogenic effects of the twelve-step philosophy and concluded that AA uses many methods that are also used by cults. A later review disagreed, stating that AA's program bore little resemblance to religious cult practices. In 2014, Vaillant published a paper making the case that Alcoholics Anonymous is not a cult.

Literature 

Alcoholics Anonymous publishes several books, reports, pamphlets, and other media, including a periodical known as the AA Grapevine. Two books are used primarily: Alcoholics Anonymous (the "Big Book") and Twelve Steps and Twelve Traditions, the latter explaining AA's fundamental principles in depth. The full text of each of these two books is available on the AA website at no charge.
  575 pages.
  192 pages.

AA in media

Film and television
 My Name Is Bill W. – dramatized biography of co-founder Bill Wilson.
 When Love Is Not Enough: The Lois Wilson Story – a 2010 film about the wife of founder Bill Wilson, and the beginnings of Alcoholics Anonymous and Al-Anon.
 Bill W. –  a 2011 biographical documentary film that tells the story of Bill Wilson using interviews, recreations, and rare archival material.
 A Walk Among the Tombstones (2015), a mystery/suspense film based on Lawrence Block's books featuring Matthew Scudder, a recovering alcoholic detective whose AA membership is a central element of the plot.
 When a Man Loves a Woman – a school counselor attends AA meetings in a residential treatment facility.
 Clean and Sober – an addict (alcohol, cocaine) visits an AA meeting to get a sponsor.
 Days of Wine and Roses – a 1962 film about a married couple struggling with alcoholism. Jack Lemmon's character attends an AA meeting in the film.
 Drunks – a 1995 film starring Richard Lewis as an alcoholic who leaves an AA meeting and relapses. The film cuts back and forth between his eventual relapse and the other meeting attendees.
 Come Back, Little Sheba – A 1952 film based on a play of the same title about a loveless marriage where the husband played by Burt Lancaster is an alcoholic who gets help from two members of the local AA chapter. A 1977 TV drama was also based on the play.
 I'll Cry Tomorrow – A 1955 film about singer Lillian Roth played by Susan Hayward who goes to AA to help her stop drinking. The film was based on Roth's autobiography of the same name detailing her alcoholism and sobriety through AA.
 You Kill Me – a 2007 crime-comedy film starring Ben Kingsley as a mob hit man with a drinking problem who is forced to accept a job at a mortuary and go to AA meetings.
 Smashed – a 2012 drama film starring Mary Elizabeth Winstead. An elementary school teacher's drinking begins to interfere with her job, so she attempts to get sober in AA.
 Don't Worry, He Won't Get Far on Foot – a 2018 biography/comedy/drama by Gus Van Sant, based on the life of cartoonist John Callahan.
 Flight — a 2012 film starring Denzel Washington as an alcoholic airline pilot.  The movie includes a dramatic representation of a prison AA meeting.
 In CBS' Elementary, Jonny Lee Miller plays an adaptation of Sherlock Holmes who is a recovering drug addict. Several episodes are centered around AA meetings and the process of recovery.

See also 

 Adult Children of Alcoholics
 Al-Anon/Alateen
 Calix Society
 Community reinforcement approach and family training (CRAFT)
 Drug addiction recovery groups
 Drug rehabilitation
 Group psychotherapy
 List of twelve-step groups
 Long-term effects of alcohol
 Recovery approach
 Short-term effects of alcohol consumption
 Stepping Stones (house), home of Bill W.
 Washingtonian movement

Notes

References

Bibliography

External links

 
 
 
 A History of Agnostic Groups in AA
 Reproduction of the 1938 Original Manuscript of Alcoholics Anonymous

 
Addiction and substance abuse organizations
Non-profit organizations based in New York City
Organizations established in 1935
Therapeutic community
Twelve-step programs